Şəhriyar or Shagriyar or Shakhriar or Shakhriyar may refer to:
 Şəhriyar, Goygol, Azerbaijan
 Şəhriyar, Masally, Azerbaijan
 Şəhriyar, Nakhchivan (disambiguation)
Şəhriyar, Ordubad, Azerbaijan
Şəhriyar, Sharur, Azerbaijan
 Şəhriyar, Sabirabad, Azerbaijan